Kırklareli is a city within Kırklareli Province in the European part of Turkey.

Name
It is not clearly known when the city was founded, nor under what name. The Byzantine Greeks called it Sarànta Ekklisiès (Σαράντα Εκκλησιές, meaning forty churches). In modern Greek it is known with the same name, too. In the 14th century this was translated to Turkish and called Kırk Kilise (40 churches). Following the establishment of the Turkish Republic in 1923, sanjaks became cities and on December 20, 1924, Kırk Kilise's name was changed to Kırklareli, meaning The Place of the Forties. The denomination Kırklareli was already used years before 1924, for example in the contemporary literature concerning the Balkan Wars of 1912–13. The Bulgarian name of the town is Lòzengrad (Лозенград) which means Vineyard Town. (see also its other names)

History

Ongoing archeological excavations in the city support the claim that the area was the location of one of the first organized settlements on the European continent, with artifacts from the Paleolithic and Neolithic periods.

The settlement and its surrounding areas were conquered by the Persians in 513–512 BC, during the reign of King Darius I.

In 914 during the Bulgarian invasion in Adrianople led by Simeon I, the settlement was captured by the Bulgarians and was under Bulgarian rule until 1003 when it was lost to the Byzantines.

The Ottoman Turks took the city and its region from the Byzantines in 1363, during the reign of Sultan Murad I.

The city was damaged during the Greek War of Independence (1821–1829).

According to the 1878 record "Ethnography of the Wilayahs Adrianopol, Monastir and Thessaloniki" Kırk Kilise was inhabited by 6,700 Bulgarians, 2,850 Greeks, and 2,700 belonging to other ethnic groups.

In 1906, the Diocese of Saranda Ekklisies was detached from the Metropolis of Adrianople and was elevated to the status of Metropolis.

According to the official Ottoman census of 1906–1907 (published in "The Ottoman Population 1830–1914: Demographic and Social Characteristics" by Kemal H. Karpat), the ethnic-religious breakdown in the Sanjak of Kırk Kilise was: 22,022 Muslims; 14,154 Greek Orthodox; 1,599 Bulgarian Orthodox; and 789 Jews.

During the Balkan Wars (1912–1913) Kırk Kilise was occupied by Bulgaria, and then by Greece in the aftermath of World War I (1914–1918) resulting in mass immigration of its Bulgarian population (there were a large number of journalists who reported on the actions at Kırk Kilise). Following the Turkish War of Independence (1919–1923) the city was retaken by the Turks on November 10, 1922. According to the 1923 population exchange agreement between Greece and Turkey, the Greeks of the city were exchanged for the Muslims (Turks, Pomaks, Karadjaovalides and Albanians) living in Greece.

Most of the inhabitants of the city are Turks who formerly lived in Thessaloniki until the First Balkan War of 1912. The Treaty of Lausanne (1923) which defines Turkey's western border in Thrace also resulted in a Kırklareli Province within Turkey.

The Megleno-Romanians of Kırklareli

In 1923 most of the 3700 inhabitants of Notia, the only Muslim village of the Megleno-Romanians in northern Greece, settled in the Edirne area (mainly in Kırklareli) and became known as Karadjovalides after the Turkish name of Moglena.

The number of these Megleno-Romanian families settled in Kırklareli were more than 110, while those settled in small villages were around 400: in total, nearly 2000 Megleno-Romanians. Currently, their number only 500, concentrated in Kırklareli and culturally assimilated into the Turks. Most of them speak the Turkish language, but are still bilingual at home.

Cultural assets

Hızır Bey Külliye: This külliye (religious complex) consists of the Hızır Bey Mosque, Hızır Bey Bath and Arasta (Bazaar.)
Hızır Bey Mosque: Located at the center of the city, it was built on a square plan by Köse Mihalzade Hızır Bey in 1383. Built of cut stone and having one minaret, it was restored by Yusuf Pasha of Aydost in 1824. Still used today, the final praying place and garden walls of the mosque were built afterwards.
Hızır Bey Bath: Also located at the center of the city and built adjacent to Bath and Arasta by Köse Mihalzade Hızır Bey in 1383. There are two entrances, one each for women and men, which are also called the "Paired Baths". According to an inscription in the women's bath, Hacı Hüseyin Ağa restored it between 1683 and 1704. Still used today, the outer walls are regular and built from coarse sandstone. It's a Turkish Bath in the traditional Ottoman architecture style.
Arasta (Bedesten): Built adjacent to the Hızır Bey Bath in a "T" form, it has arch-type walls. The upper cover is a vault 15 m long. There were 12 shops inside formed by three beams. It was restored in 1704.
Kırklareli Jewish Quarter: A historic neighborhood.
Kırklareli Museum: A natural history, ethnography and archaeology museum.
Dupnisa Cave: Kırklareli Province is also host to the only cave that is open to tourists in Thrace, the Dupnisa Cave near the village of Sarpdere, which is believed to have formed circa 4 million years ago. The Dupnisa Cave was used for Dionysian Rituals (Sparagmos) in ancient times. Even the name of Dionysus is associated with Mount Nisa right above the cave of Dupnisa; as, according to ancient Greek mythology, Dionysus "discovered wine while playing at Mount Nisa." The Bulgarian name of Kırklareli, Lozengrad (Лозенград) which means Vineyard Town may also have its origins in this ancient Greek myth.
Demirköy Foundry: Archaeological site of a historic iron foundry, where cannonballs fired during the Conquest of Constantinople in 1453 were manufactured.

Climate
Kırklareli has a borderline Mediterranean and humid subtropical climate (Köppen climate classification: Csa/Cfa, Trewartha climate classification: Do). Summers are hot and humid whilst winters are cool, cloudy and damp. Rainfall is somewhat common throughout the year, but is lower in amount and intensity than in coastal cities, largely due to the rain shadow caused by the Istranca massif to the immediate northeast. Snowfall is somewhat common between the months of December and March, snowing for a week or two.

Sister cities
 Kırklareli is twinned with:

 Manisa, Turkey

Notable natives
 Anthim I (1816-1888), first head of the Bulgarian Exarchate
 Nikola Aslanov (1875-1905), Bulgarian revolutionary
 Candan Erçetin, (born 1961), female singer, songwriter and Vice-President of Galatasaray SK
 Şaban Erden (born 1949), Deputy Secretary General of the Istanbul Metropolitan Municipality
 Barış Hersek (born 1988), professional basketball player
 Nikolaos Mavridis (1869-1927), wine merchant
 Ayşenur Taşbakan (born 1982), European champion female taekwondo practitioner
 Burak Akkul (born 1972) humorist
 Serap Belet (born 1978) anchorwomen
 Burhan Öçal (born 1959) percussion artist

See also
Battle of Kirk Kilisse

Notes
The modern name comes from Kırk Kilise Sancağı as written on this 1907 Ottoman Turkish map of the vilayet of Adrionople.

References

External links
 Kırklareli News
 Kırklareli Photos

 
Jewish communities in Turkey
Districts of Kırklareli Province
Pomak communities in Turkey